Dafydd Trystan Davies (born 11 August 1974) is a Welsh academic and politician, who was chair of Plaid Cymru from 2013 until 2019, when he was replaced by Alun Ffred Jones. Trystan is currently the Senior Academic Manager and Registrar for Coleg Cymraeg Cenedlaethol.

Dafydd Trystan Davies was born in Aberdare and now lives in Grangetown, Cardiff.  He studied at Ysgol Rhydfelen and at Aberystwyth University, gaining a doctorate for his work on Globalisation and the Welsh economy.

Davies was Plaid's parliamentary candidate for the Cynon Valley constituency at the 2010 general election, and was the party's candidate for the Welsh Assembly for the same constituency in 2011.  In July 2013 he was selected as Plaid's Welsh Assembly candidate for the Cardiff South and Penarth seat, for the elections in 2016, where he came third with 14.3% of the votes.

Davies succeeded Helen Mary Jones in the position of chair at the annual conference of Plaid Cymru in October 2013.

References

Living people
Plaid Cymru politicians
Alumni of Aberystwyth University
Welsh scholars and academics
Welsh-speaking politicians
1974 births